Sainte-Foy–Sillery is a former borough of Quebec City (Population (2006): 72,262).  It comprised the former city of Sillery and most of Sainte-Foy, which were incorporated into the borough on January 1, 2002.

On November 1, 2009, the new borough of Sainte-Foy–Sillery–Cap-Rouge was created, including the area of the former city of Cap-Rouge and the part of Sainte-Foy that had not been incorporated earlier into the former borough; these had been incorporated into the borough of Laurentien in 2002.  In the 2009 reorganization, Laurentien was dismembered and ceased to exist.

See also
 2000–06 municipal reorganization in Quebec

References 
The information in this article is based on that in its French equivalent.

Former boroughs of Quebec City